These are things named after Emil Artin, a mathematician.
 Ankeny–Artin–Chowla congruence
 Artin algebra
 Artin billiards
 Artin braid group
 Artin character
 Artin conductor
 Artin's conjecture for conjectures by Artin. These include
 Artin's conjecture on primitive roots
 Artin conjecture on L-functions
 Artin group
 Artin–Hasse exponential
 Artin L-function
 Artin reciprocity
 Artin–Rees lemma
 Artin representation
 Artin–Schreier theorem
 Artin–Schreier theory
 Artin's theorem on induced characters
 Artin–Zorn theorem
 Artinian ideal
 Artinian module
 Artinian ring
 Artin–Tate lemma
 Artin–Tits group
 Fox–Artin arc
 Wedderburn–Artin theorem
 Emil Artin Junior Prize in Mathematics

See also
 Artinian

Artin